The 2015 Sport 1 Open was a professional tennis tournament played on clay courts. It was the 23rd edition of the tournament which was part of the 2015 ATP Challenger Tour. It took place in Scheveningen, Netherlands between 20 and 26 July 2015.

Singles main-draw entrants

Seeds

 1 Rankings are as of July 13, 2015.

Other entrants
The following players received wildcards into the singles main draw:
  Scott Griekspoor
  Florian Mayer
  Tim van Terheijden
  Thomas Schoorel

The following players received entry from the qualifying draw:
  Philipp Davydenko
  Artem Smirnov  
  Roy de Valk
  Alexey Vatutin

The following players entered received entry as lucky losers:
  Alexandre Folie
  Alexandre Sidorenko

Champions

Singles

 Nikoloz Basilashvili def.  Andrey Kuznetsov 6–7(3–7), 7–6(7–4), 6–3

Doubles

 Ariel Behar /  Eduardo Dischinger def.  Aslan Karatsev /  Andrey Kuznetsov 0–0, retired

External links
Official Website

Sport 1 Open
2015
2015 in Dutch tennis